Court Street Historic District is a national historic district located at Binghamton in Broome County, New York.  The district includes 87 contributing buildings and encompasses the historic downtown core of downtown Binghamton.  The majority of the contributing structures are commercial buildings built between about 1840 and 1939.  Ten and twelve story office buildings built in the 20th century are prominent features of the district.  Located within the boundaries of the district are the separately listed Broome County Courthouse and Binghamton City Hall.

It was listed on the National Register of Historic Places in 1984.

References

External links

Buildings and structures in Binghamton, New York
Historic districts on the National Register of Historic Places in New York (state)
Historic districts in Broome County, New York
National Register of Historic Places in Broome County, New York